Embassy of Ukraine to the Kingdom of Belgium is the diplomatic mission of the Ukraine to the Kingdom of Belgium; it is based in Brussels, Belgium.

Mission

The main task of the Embassy of Ukraine in Brussels is to represent the interests of Ukraine, to promote the development of political, economic, cultural, scientific and other relations, as well as to protect the rights and interests of Ukrainian citizens and legal entities that are in the territory of the Kingdom of Belgium and the Grand Duchy of Luxembourg.

The Embassy contributes to the development of interstate relations between Ukraine and Belgium, Ukraine and the Grand Duchy of Luxembourg at all levels, to ensure the harmonious development of mutual relations and cooperation on issues of common interest. The Embassy also performs consular functions.

History

Following the proclamation of Ukraine's independence on 24 August 1991, Belgium recognized Ukraine on 31 December 1991. On 10 March 1992, diplomatic relations were established between Ukraine and Belgium. Grand Duchy of Luxembourg recognized Ukraine's independence along with other EU countries on 31 December 1991. Diplomatic relations between the two countries were established on 1 July 1992.

Heads of the Mission

See also
 Belgium–Ukraine relations
 Foreign relations of Ukraine

References 

Brussels
Ukraine
Belgium–Ukraine relations